The East Riding of Yorkshire is a unitary authority in the ceremonial county of the East Riding of Yorkshire, England. It was created on 1 April 1996 replacing East Yorkshire, East Yorkshire Borough of Beverley, Holderness, part of Boothferry and Humberside County Council.

The East Riding of Yorkshire Council is fully elected every four years.

The council consists of 67 councillors who are elected from 26 wards. Each ward elects one, two or three councillors.

Political control
The first election to the council was held in 1995, initially operating as a shadow authority before coming into its powers on 1 April 1996. Political control of the council since 1995 has been held by the following parties:

Leadership
The first leader of the council, Stephen Parnaby, was the last leader of one of the predecessor councils, the East Yorkshire Borough of Beverley. The leaders of the council since 1996 have been:

Council elections
1995 East Riding of Yorkshire Council election
1999 East Riding of Yorkshire Council election
2003 East Riding of Yorkshire Council election
2007 East Riding of Yorkshire Council election
2011 East Riding of Yorkshire Council election
2015 East Riding of Yorkshire Council election
2019 East Riding of Yorkshire Council election

By-election results

1995–1999

1999–2003

2003–2007

2011–2015

2015–2019

2019–2023

References

External links
East Riding of Yorkshire Council

 
Council elections in the East Riding of Yorkshire
Unitary authority elections in England